Hamont-Achel is a city and municipality located in the Belgian province of Limburg. It was founded in 1977 by a fusion of the city Hamont and the village Achel. On January 1, 2020, Hamont-Achel had a total population of 14.294. The total area is 43.66 km² which gives a population density of 315 inhabitants per km². The municipality houses the Trappist Abbey of Achel, part of which is Brouwerij de Achelse Kluis, one of the 11 Trappist breweries.

The professional tennis player Elise Mertens (WTA 35 - 2017) lives in Hamont-Achel.

Demographics

Languages
 Dutch in Hamont-Achel is often spoken with a distinctive Limburgish accent, which should not be confused with the Limburgish language.
 Limburgish (or Limburgian) is the overlapping term of the tonal dialects spoken in the Belgian and Dutch provinces of Limburg. The Hamont-Achel dialect is only one of many variants of Limburgish.

Deadly explosion

On 18 November 1918, the municipality was the site of one of the worst train explosions in history, when two German munitions trains caught fire and exploded. Not only were the trains destroyed, but three German ambulance trains were also wiped out, along with most of the town. More than 1,000 individuals were killed.

Tumulus on Haarterheide

References

Bibliography

External links
 
 Website about Hamont-Achel 
 The Pessimist's Guide to History 
 sporza.be report on Jelle Vanendert's return home after the 2011 Tour de France

 
Municipalities of Limburg (Belgium)